Albany Creek is a southern suburb in the Moreton Bay Region, Queensland, Australia.

Geography 
Albany Creek is located approximately 17 kilometres north-west of the Brisbane central business district.

Cashs Crossing is a historic crossing point of the South Pine River . It takes its name from early settlers James and Mary Cash, who settled near the crossing point. South Pine Road now crosses the river at that point via a bridge.

History 
Albany Creek is situated in the Yugarabul traditional Indigenous Australian country.

The suburb of Albany Creek was originally established on the intersection of two Aboriginal tracks.  The main track formed the primary route north of Brisbane and is still known as "Old Northern Road".  The second track formed a route from Old Northern Road to Little Cabbage Tree Creek in Aspley and onto Downfall Creek in Chermside.  Albany Creek Road and Gympie Road now follow this second route.

Albany Creek was originally known as Chinaman's Creek before its name was changed in 1885 to honour the Duke of Albany.

A United Methodist Free Church opened in Chinaman's Creek on Sunday 30 December 1866.

Chinaman's Creek State School opened on 25 January 1875, but was downgraded to Chinamans Creek Provisional School in 1883. In 1887 it became Albany Creek State School.

Cashs Crossing at the South Pine River was on the main route from Brisbane to Gympie. In 1891 it was proposed to build a bridge over it. Construction of the bridge had commenced by August 1892. South Pine Bridge was completed in November 1892. It survived the disastrous floods in February 1893 despite three days of great concern.

Initially a rural area, Albany Creek began to develop as a suburban area in the 1960s as the Brisbane metropolitan area expanded. This led to the opening of more schools to cater for the growing population with Albany Hills State School opening on 30 January 1979, Albany Creek State High School opening on 25 January 1982, Good Shepherd Christian (Baptist) School opening in 1983, and All Saints (Catholic) Primary School opening on 24 January 1989.

Albany Creek public library opened in 2000.

The median age of the Albany Creek population was 38, 1 year above the national median of 37. 79% of people living in Albany Creek were born in Australia. The other top responses for country of birth were England 4.9%, New Zealand 3.4%, South Africa 2%, Scotland 0.8%, and Italy 0.4%. 92.4% of people spoke only English at home; the next most common languages were 0.7% Italian, 0.4% Afrikaans, 0.4% German, 0.3% Hindi, and 0.3% Cantonese.

Education 
Albany Creek State School is a government primary (Prep-6) school for boys and girls at 696 Albany Creek Road. In 2017, the school had an enrolment of 847 students with 59 teachers (51 full-time equivalent) and 31 non-teaching staff (20 full-time equivalent). In 2018, the school had an enrolment of 844 students with 60 teachers (51 full-time equivalent) and 34 non-teaching staff (22 full-time equivalent). It includes a special education program.

Albany Hills State School is a government primary (Prep-6) school for boys and girls at Keong Road. In 2017, the school had an enrolment of 812 students with 58 teachers (51 full-time equivalent) and 33 non-teaching staff (21 full-time equivalent).  In 2018, the school had an enrolment of 827 students with 64 teachers (56 full-time equivalent) and 38 non-teaching staff (23 full-time equivalent). It includes a special education program.

All Saints Primary School is a private Catholic primary (Prep-6) school for boys and girls at 4 Faheys Road East. In 2017, the school had an enrolment of 656 students with 42 teachers (36 full-time equivalent) and 30 non-teaching staff (19 full-time equivalent). In 2018, the school had an enrolment of 645 students with 44 teachers (37 full-time equivalent) and 31 non-teaching staff (19 full-time equivalent).

Good Shepherd Christian School is a private Baptist primary and secondary (Prep-12) school for boys and girls at 185 Old Northern Road. In 2017, the school had an enrolment of 109 students with 14 teachers (11 full-time equivalent) and 10 non-teaching staff (4 full-time equivalent). In 2018, the school had an enrolment of 108 students with 13 teachers (11 full-time equivalent) and 8 non-teaching staff (5 full-time equivalent).

Albany Creek State High School is a government secondary (7-12) school for boys and girls at Albany Forest Drive. In 2017, the school had an enrolment of 1261 students with 104 teachers (97 full-time equivalent) and 45 non-teaching staff (31 full-time equivalent). It includes a special education program. In 2018, the school had an enrolment of 1305 students with 102 teachers (97 full-time equivalent) and 52 non-teaching staff (34 full-time equivalent). It includes a special education program.

Amenities

Albany Creek has three main shopping centres, including Woolworths, Aldi and a Centro Albany Creek, which hosts a Coles supermarket. Several smaller shopping facilities are also located along Albany Creek Road.

The Albany Creek Library is located at 16 Ferguson Street.

Albany Creek has the following churches:

 Good Shepherd Baptist Church
 All Saints Parish
 Albany Creek Uniting Church, 652 Albany Creek Road
 Southpine Seventh-day Adventist Church

There are a number of parks in the area:

 Bill Patterson Way
 Bunya Crossing
 Clarrie Beckingham Reserve
 Daniel Reserve
 Jacaranda Park
 Kim Grayson Park
 Leotine Cooper Park
 Mahaca Park
 Mountford Park
 Parkview Place Park
 Richard Lee Reserve
 Stanton Reserve
 Wolter Park

Sport
The local soccer or football club is ACE FC. With over 1000 registered players and more than 2,500 members, it is the largest soccer club in Brisbane. It provides for junior and senior players. Its other activities include the clubs Kindy Program for players aged 3 to 5, and the club's Football School which provides players a soccer development program for 12 months of the year and is modelled on European academies. In the off-season, ACE FC provides a Five A Side Competition which incorporates over 35 men and women. The Five A Side competition has grown to be one of the largest off-season social comps in Brisbane.  ACE FC coaching staff include ex-European players Salvo Sottile as Technical Director, Josh McCloughan, retired Brisbane Roar defender and Roberto Lettieri who played National League at the end of his career after a successful season in Brazil.

Albany Creek's local rugby league club team is the Albany Creek Crushers.

The suburb also has a cricket team that goes by the name of Albany Creek Hawks or just Albany Creek Cricket Club.

Transport 
Albany Creek is located in Zones 4 and 5 of the TransLink public transport fare system and is serviced by several Brisbane Transport bus routes. The nearest railway station is Strathpine.

Notable residents
 Bronte Barrett, Olympic gold medalist, swam for Albany Creek and trained at the Albany Creek Leisure Centre
 Leith Brodie, Olympic bronze medalist, swam for Albany Creek and trained at the Albany Creek Leisure Centre
 Scott Daruda, Super Rugby rugby union player, grew up and played football in Albany Creek
 Robbie Kruse, Queensland Roar Striker, played for Albany Creek Excelsior Soccer Club in his youth
 Nelle Lee, actress grew up in and attended school in Albany Creek
 Anthony Morris, screenwriter, lives in Albany Creek
 Jessica and Lisa Origliasso, the female pop duo The Veronicas, twin sisters, grew up in Albany Creek 
 Kylie Palmer, Olympic gold medalist, swam for Albany Creek and trained at the Albany Creek Leisure Centre
 Patrick Rafter, two time U.S. Open winning tennis player, attended Albany Creek State High School 
Matt Renshaw, Australian and Queensland representative cricket player attended Albany Hills State School 
 Lisa Skinner, gymnast, represented Australia at 3 Olympics attended Albany Creek Primary School
 Geoff Trappett, Paralympic athlete, won gold and silver medals, grew up in Albany Creek.
 Ben Tune, former Wallaby and Queensland Reds great, grew up in Albany Creek

References

Further reading

External links

 

Suburbs of Moreton Bay Region